Roz Witt is an American television and film actress.

She has appeared in minor roles in the television series Monk, Desperate Housewives, CSI: Crime Scene Investigation, Judging Amy, The X-Files, Diagnosis: Murder, Brothers & Sisters, The West Wing, Without a Trace, She Spies, Big Time Rush, Sabrina, the Teenage Witch, Felicity, Chicago Hope, George Lopez, The Drew Carey Show, NYPD Blue, Lois & Clark: The New Adventures of Superman, How I Met Your Mother, Matlock, Mr. Belvedere, Falcon Crest, 'Til Death and ER, amongst others. She has also had minor roles in a number of films including Caffeine, Tank Girl, The Hillside Strangler, The Windfisherman, and A Song for Honest Abe.

External links
 

American television actresses
American film actresses
Living people
Place of birth missing (living people)
Year of birth missing (living people)
21st-century American women